René García may refer to:

 René García (footballer, born 1961), Mexican football manager and former striker
 René García (politician) (born 1974), American politician
 René García (footballer, born 1989), Mexican football forward